Pam Postema (born April 1954 in Willard, Ohio) is a former American baseball umpire. In 1988 she became the first female baseball umpire to officiate a Major League Baseball spring training game. For her unique contributions to the game, she was inducted into the Baseball Reliquary's Shrine of the Eternals in 2000.

Education 
Postema first applied to the Al Somers Umpire School in Florida (now the Harry Wendelstedt Umpire School) in 1976. She submitted three applications before finally being enrolled. Her class was originally 130 but by the end of the season 30 had quit or been asked to leave. Pam, despite making it and graduating seventeenth in her class, struggled to find a job for three months post-graduation.

Early career 
In 1977, Postema received an offer for a job in the rookie Gulf Coast League. She spent two years there, after which she had two-year stints in both Class A and Double-A, becoming the first woman to umpire at those levels, before being promoted to Triple-A baseball in the Pacific Coast League. During her six years at the Triple-A level, Postema was looked highly upon by many players, although other players objected to the notion of a female umpire.

Postema was involved in an unusual incident during a May 30, 1984, game between the Portland Beavers and  Vancouver Canadians. Beavers manager Lee Elia was ejected for arguing a called third strike, and subsequently threw a chair onto the field before leaving the dugout. Postema then directed the team's batboy to retrieve the chair from the field. Acting on instructions from Beavers players in the dugout, he refused, resulting in Postema ejecting the batboy.

MLB career 
Although often considered a prospect for major league umpiring, Pam Postema never received the call until in 1988, when Baseball Commissioner Bart Giamatti offered her a contract to officiate at the MLB level during spring training. Later that year, Giamatti also offered her a chance to umpire at the "Hall of Fame Game" between the New York Yankees and the Atlanta Braves. Both opportunities looked promising, and she hoped to gain a contract into the major league. Unfortunately, Giamatti died soon thereafter in 1989, and Postema never again got the chance to umpire in the major leagues. In December 1989, the Triple-A Alliance cancelled Postema's contract after 13 years of well-regarded experience in the minor leagues. She then filed a sex-discrimination lawsuit at the federal level. She stated, "I believe I belong in the major leagues. If it weren't for the fact that I'm a woman, I would be there right now."

After baseball 
In 1992, Postema published a book entitled You've Gotta Have Balls to Make It In This League. Following her umpiring career, she worked as a trucker, a factory worker, and later a welder, but quit in order to take care of her father, who was afflicted with Alzheimer's disease. On March 29, 2007, Ria Cortesio became the second female umpire to work a Major League spring training game.

See also
Bernice Gera
Christine Wren
Ria Cortesio
Women in baseball

References

External links
"Against All Odds" article in Referee magazine
Baseball Reliquary Tribute

Minor league baseball umpires
1954 births
Living people
People from Willard, Ohio